Mitoc is a commune in Botoșani County, Western Moldavia, Romania. It is composed of two villages, Horia and Mitoc.

Natives
 Florică Murariu

References

Communes in Botoșani County
Localities in Western Moldavia
Populated places on the Prut